Countess of Northesk is a title normally given to the wife of the Earl of Northesk. Women who have held this title include:

Anne Carnegie, Countess of Northesk (1730-1779), wife of George Carnegie, 6th Earl of Northesk
Jill Gomez, singer (born 1942), wife of Patrick Carnegy, 15th Earl of Northesk